Tímea Babos and Hsieh Su-wei were the defending champions, but Babos decided not to participate.
Hsieh played alongside Daniela Hantuchová, but they withdrew in the quarterfinals due to Hsieh upper respiratory illness.
Third seeded Ashleigh Barty and Casey Dellacqua won the final over Cara Black and Marina Erakovic with the score of 7–5, 6–4.

Seeds

Draw

Draw

References
 Main Draw

Aegon Classicandnbsp;- Doubles
Doubles